Edward J. Smejkal (January 1, 1876 – January 9, 1933) was an American lawyer and politician.

Biography
Smejkal was born in Chicago, Illinois. He went to the Chicago public schools and graduated from Lake Forest College. Smejkal was admitted to the Illinois bar and practiced law in Chicago. He served in the Illinois House of Representatives from 1903 to 1925 and was a Republican. Smejkal died in a hospital in Berwyn, Illinois. He had been in ill health and had suffered from diabetes for a few years. He committed suicide using poison and gas at his home.

References

External links

1876 births
1933 suicides
Lawyers from Chicago
Politicians from Chicago
Lake Forest College alumni
Republican Party members of the Illinois House of Representatives
Suicides in Illinois
American politicians who committed suicide
Suicides by poison
Suicides by gas